The imperial standard is the flag used by an emperor and sometimes the members of his family. Today only Japan has a monarch with the imperial title.

Imperial Standard of Austria (1806-1918)
Imperial Standard of Byzantium (c. 1350)
Flags of the Empire of China (1862-1912)
Imperial Standard of Germany (1871-1918)
Imperial Standard of the Holy Roman Empire (12th Century-1806)
Imperial Standards of Iran (1926-1979)
Imperial Standard of Japan
Imperial Standard of the Ottoman Empire (Late 19th Century-1923)
Imperial Standard of Russia (19th Century-1917)

See also

Royal standard
Presidential standard

Standards (flags)